"La Media Vuelta" ("Turn Around") is a song written and performed by Mexican singer José Alfredo Jiménez released in 1963. One of Jiménez' most famous compositions, the song has become part of the traditional Mexican musical repertoire, and has been recorded by dozens of singers and groups.

Javier Solís version
The first version of the song to chart in Mexico was that of Javier Solís. His recording entered the Mexican charts on the 22 June 1963 week, peaking at number three on 20 July. The song would remain on the top 10 for almost six months, for a total of 27 weeks.

Weekly charts

Luis Miguel version

It was covered by Mexican singer Luis Miguel on his album Segundo Romance where it was released as the second single from the album in November 1994 and reached number one on both the Billboard Hot Latin Songs and the Latin Pop Airplay charts. "La Media Vuelta" also became a number-one hit in Mexico and Panama; and a top-ten single in four other countries.

Luis Miguel's rendition is performed as a ranchera-bolero and features horns, strings, and Spanish guitars. Its music video, directed by Pedro Torres and  filmed in black-and-white, features Miguel reminiscing at a bar about a woman who deceived him. Several Mexican celebrities including Juan Gabriel, Lola Beltrán, Amalia Mendoza, Katy Jurado, Pablo Montero, Carlos Monsiváis, Ofelia Medina and Jiménez's son made guest appearances in the video. "La Media Vuelta" won the Lo Nuestro award for Video of the Year. It was recognized as one of best-performing songs of the year at the 1996 ASCAP Latin Awards. A live version of the song was included on his album El Concierto (1995).

Charts

Weekly charts

Year-end charts

Other covers

"La Media Vuelta" was covered by Tejano singer Michael Salgado on his album De Buenas Raíces (1996). His version peaked at number 38 on the Hot Latin Songs chart.

See also
List of number-one hits of 1994 (Mexico)
Billboard Top Latin Songs Year-End Chart
List of number-one Billboard Hot Latin Tracks of 1994
List of number-one Billboard Latin Pop Airplay songs of 1994

References 

Songs written by José Alfredo Jiménez
1963 songs
1994 singles
Luis Miguel songs
Warner Music Latina singles